Chintpurni Assembly constituency is one of the 68 assembly constituencies of Himachal Pradesh a northern Indian state. Chintpurni is also part of Hamirpur, Himachal Pradesh Lok Sabha constituency.

Members of Legislative Assembly

Election candidate

2022

Election results

2017

See also
 Chintpurni
 Una district
 Hamirpur, Himachal Pradesh Lok Sabha constituency

References

External links
 

Una district
Assembly constituencies of Himachal Pradesh